Klaas Boot (28 July 1898 – 12 May 1969) was a Dutch gymnast. He competed in seven events at the 1928 Summer Olympics.

References

1898 births
1969 deaths
Dutch male artistic gymnasts
Olympic gymnasts of the Netherlands
Gymnasts at the 1928 Summer Olympics
Sportspeople from North Holland